The Quaker Flour Mill, also known as Show Room , is a historic building in Pueblo, Colorado.  The building once served as a flour mill and in 1976 it was a theatre.  It was listed on the National Register of Historic Places in 1976.

Its original portion, built in 1869, is the oldest building in Pueblo.  It was used first by the Quaker Flour Mill, and, from 1879, by the South Pueblo Flour Mill. In about 1890 it was bought by the Joseph Schlitz Brewing Co. which operated it to bottle and distribute beer, up to the Prohibition.

In 1890 the fourth floor and the gable roof were removed and a two-story brick section was added at the front. A one-story extension to the rear was added in 1927.

References

National Register of Historic Places
Colorado Historical Society

Grinding mills on the National Register of Historic Places in Colorado
Flour mills in the United States
Quaker Oats Company
Theatres in Colorado
National Register of Historic Places in Pueblo, Colorado
Grinding mills in Colorado
1869 establishments in Colorado Territory
Theatres completed in 1976
Industrial buildings completed in 1869